British singer-songwriter, pianist and composer Elton John has recorded a total of 464 songs, most of which are written by him and Bernie Taupin.

John formed the blues band Bluesology in 1962. After leaving Bluesology in 1967 to embark on a solo career, John met Taupin after they both answered an advert for songwriters, and he released his debut album Empty Sky in 1969. In 1970, John formed the Elton John Band with Dee Murray and Nigel Olsson, and released his first hit single, "Your Song". His band has gone through several lineup changes, but Olsson, Davey Johnstone, and Ray Cooper have been members, albeit not continuously, since 1970, 1971 and 1973 respectively. 

John's critical and commercial success was at its peak in the 1970s, when John released a streak of chart-topping albums in the US and UK which began with Honky Château (1972) and culminated with Blue Moves (1976), and also included his best-selling album Goodbye Yellow Brick Road (1973) and concept album Captain Fantastic and the Brown Dirt Cowboy (1975). John's live performances during the 1970s were also successful, with his 1975 performance at Dodger Stadium marking the pinnacle of his fame.

While not achieving the same level of success as his 1970s body of work, John's music in the 1980s was also successful, with a release of hit singles including "I'm Still Standing" and "Sacrifice". Following the death of Princess Diana in 1997, John released the double A-side charity single "Candle in the Wind 1997"/"Something About the Way You Look Tonight", which sold over 33million copies worldwide, and also performed the tribute single at Diana's funeral. John composed music with Tim Rice for The Lion King in 1993 and Aida in 2000, and has continued to record new music in the 21st century.

Since 2018, John has been touring alongside his band on the farewell tour Farewell Yellow Brick Road, which was originally planned to conclude in 2020, but was extended to 2023 due to the COVID-19 pandemic. John announced in 2018 that he would retire from live performances after the farewell tour so he could spend more time with his family, having done over 4,000 concert performances in more than 80 countries.

Songs

Notes

References

John, Elton